20 Years of Noise 1985–2005 is a compilation album of the Italian extreme metal band Necrodeath. The last four songs were taken from The Shining Pentagram demo.

Track listing
Mater Tenebrarum
Internal Decay
Choose Your Death
Metempsychosis
Hate And Scorn
At The Roots Of Evil
Red As Blood
Church's Black Book
The Mark Of Dr. Z
Perseverance Pays
Black Sabbath (Black Sabbath cover)
(Necro) Thrashin' Death (Demo)
Iconoclast (Demo)
Mater Tenebrarum (Demo)
Morbid Mayhem (Demo)

2005 greatest hits albums
Necrodeath compilation albums
Scarlet Records compilation albums